Kwisi may refer to:
Kwisi people
Kwisi language